The Big News  was the evening television news program of ABC 5. It was the first evening news program on Philippine television. It aired from March 19, 1962, to September 22, 1972. On February 21, 1992, in line with the network's reopening, the program was revived and was originally anchored by Eric Eloriaga, Tina Monzon-Palma and Kathy Tanco-Ong and continued to air until August 8, 2008. Cherie Mercado and Amelyn Veloso serves as the final anchors. It was replaced by TEN: The Evening News on August 11, 2008.

History

The Big News (1962–1972)
The Big News was originally anchored by Duds Rivera and Bong Lapira with Antonio Tecson as head of the newsroom. Lapira later left the newscast in 1967 to transfer to ABS-CBN to anchor Newsbreak on DZXL-TV Channel 9 and he was replaced by Jose Mari Velez. The show first aired on March 19, 1962, and went off the air in 1972 due to martial law.

The Big News (1992–2004)
On February 21, 1992, as ABC returned to the airwaves, the program resumed its telecast, but this time, it was anchored by Eric Eloriaga and Tina Monzon-Palma. In 1993, they were joined in by Kathy Tanco-Ong. In May 1997, they were replaced by Anthony Pangilinan and Thelma Dumpit-Murillo, who also anchors the network's early evening Filipino newscast Balitang Balita as its new anchors. Tanco-Ong would bow out of the newscast a year later and was replaced by Janice Pronstoller thereafter. Monzon-Palma went to become anchor of ABS-CBN's late night newscast The World Tonight while Eloriaga became anchor of RPN's NewsWatch, both newscast's main rivals during pre-Martial Law days.

On May 3, 1999, Amelyn Veloso became the new anchor of the newscast. On May 22, 2000, Veloso was joined by Rod Nepomuceno as her co-anchor, replacing Pangilinan. On June 3, 2002, Nepomuceno was replaced by Atty. Mike Toledo.

Big News (2004–2008)
On April 12, 2004, when the network reformatted most of its programs, former ABS-CBN anchor Cherie Mercado, joining with Veloso as co-anchor and the newscast switched to Filipino in order to compete with the other networks' newscasts.

On October 2, 2006, the newscast exchanged timeslots with Sentro, the early-evening news program of the network.

On August 8, 2008, the program, together with Sentro aired its final broadcast and on the next day (August 9), the station was rebranded as TV5.

Anchors
 Duds Rivera (1962–1972)
 Bong Lapira (1962–1967)
 Jose Mari Velez (1967–1972)
 Eric Eloriaga (1992–1997)
 Tina Monzon-Palma (1992–1997)
 Kathy Tanco-Ong (1993–1998)
 Anthony Pangilinan (1997–2000)
 Thelma Dumpit-Murillo (1997–1999)
 Janice Pronstroller (1998–1999)
 Amelyn Veloso (1999–2006)
 Rod Nepomuceno (2000–2002)
 Atty. Mike Toledo (2002–2004)
 Cherie Mercado (2004–2008)

Substitute anchors
Joseph Andres
Jove Francisco
Martin Andanar

Gallery

References

See also
 List of programs aired by TV5 (Philippine TV network)
 ABC News
 Aksyon
 Frontline Pilipinas

TV5 (Philippine TV network) news shows
TV5 (Philippine TV network) original programming
1960s Philippine television series
1970s Philippine television series
1990s Philippine television series
1962 Philippine television series debuts
1972 Philippine television series endings
1992 Philippine television series debuts
2008 Philippine television series endings
English-language television shows
Filipino-language television shows